Álvaro Daniel Rodríguez Muñoz (born 14 July 2004), is a professional footballer who plays as a forward for Real Madrid Castilla. Born in Spain, he represents Uruguay at youth international level.

Early life
Álvaro was born on 14 July 2004 in Palamós, Spain. He is the son of former Uruguayan international footballer Coquito, and a Spanish mother.

Club career
Álvaro began his youth career at the age of six with local academy C.F. Global Palamós. After a year-long stint at CEF Gironès-Sàbat, he joined the youth setup of Girona FC. After five years there, he would join La Fábrica at Real Madrid where he would go on to win the 2022 Copa del Rey Juvenil. After impressing with the Juvenil sides, Álvaro made his professional debut for Real Madrid Castilla on 24 October 2021, coming on as a substitute in a 3–1 loss at Atlético Sanluqueño. He would make his first start for the reserve side on 8 January 2022, also scoring his first professional goal, in a 3–1 victory over FC Andorra. Álvaro received his first call-up to the senior side on 22 October 2022, remaining on the bench in a 3–1 victory over Sevilla in La Liga. He made his debut for the senior team on 3 January 2023 in a 1–0 Copa del Rey victory over Cacereño.

He made his La Liga debut for Real Madrid in a 2–0 win against Osasuna on 19 February 2023 in which he made a late assist after another was ruled offside. On 25 February, he scored his first La Liga goal in a 1–1 draw against Atlético Madrid.

International career 
Born in Spain to a father from Uruguay, Álvaro is eligible to represent both countries at the international level.

Spain
Álvaro was included in the squad of the under-18 team for the 2022 Mediterranean Games. He played all three games and scored one goal as the side finished last in their group.

Uruguay
On 22 August 2022 Álvaro officially committed his international future to the Uruguay national team.

Style of play
Álvaro is a left-footed centre-forward renowned for his height, although he can also play out wide. Marca highlight the fact he excels in his reading of the game, as well as his movement. Álvaro attacks space well and provides good runs for midfielders. Blessed with the Uruguayan attitude, he works tirelessly and is not afraid of putting in a challenge for his side.

Personal life
He is the grand-nephew of former Uruguayan international footballer Climaco Rodríguez.

Career statistics

Club

References

External links
 Real Madrid profile
 
 

2004 births
Living people
Uruguayan footballers
Spanish footballers
Spain youth international footballers
Uruguayan people of Spanish descent
Sportspeople of Spanish descent
Spanish people of Uruguayan descent
Sportspeople of Uruguayan descent
Association football forwards
Real Madrid CF players
Real Madrid Castilla footballers
Primera Federación players
People from Baix Empordà
Sportspeople from the Province of Girona
Footballers from Catalonia
People with acquired Uruguayan citizenship